Gian Luca Barundun (June 28, 1994 – November 4, 2018) was a Swiss downhill and alpine combined skier who represented his nation on the World Cup Skiing circuit.

Biography
Barandun had skied in eight World Cup events for Switzerland. His best finish on the World Cup circuit was ninth place in Bormio during December 2017. He was considered to have been one of Switzerland's most promising competitive downhill skiers.

Death
Barandun died in a paragliding accident on November 4, 2018. He was 24.

References

1994 births
2018 deaths
Swiss male alpine skiers
21st-century Swiss people